Stepan Tverdislavich (died August 16, 1243), the son of Tverdislav, was a Novgorodian posadnik in 1230–43.

After 1220 Stepan merged into the Novgorodian political struggle. He showed himself as an adherent of the alliance with Vladimir-Suzdal princes, considering them helpful against Germans and Swedes. In 1230 Stepan arranged a coup to be elected posadnik. He managed to smooth the rivalry between the boyar factions, which facilitated Novgorodian victories over external enemies in 1234, 1240 and 1242.

Notes

Posadniks of Novgorod
1243 deaths
Year of birth unknown